Mollalar may refer to:
Mollalar (40° 05' N 46° 50' E), Agdam, Azerbaijan
Mollalar (40° 09' N 46° 52' E), Agdam, Azerbaijan
Mollalar (40° 15' N 47° 29' E), Barda, Azerbaijan
Mollalar (40° 27' N 47° 11' E), Barda, Azerbaijan
Mollalar, Lachin, Azerbaijan
Mollalar, Tovuz, Azerbaijan
Mollalar, Ardabil, Iran
Mollalar, East Azerbaijan, Iran
Mollalar-e Mohammadreza Kandi, East Azerbaijan Province, Iran
Mollalar, Zanjan, Iran